Gang Jiyeon or Kang Chiyon was a civilian in the Korean Goryeo dynasty periods. He came from the Sincheon Gang clan.

Biography
When Mongol invasion of Korea happened and Goryeo military regime relocate capital to Ganghwado, Gang Chiyon was a senior vassal. After relocation of capital, he also held important posts of politics.

Family line

According to Korean history book like Goryeosa and Pyeonnyeon-Tong-Long, Gang Chiyon is 12 generation descent of Gang Chung and 14 generation descent of Gang Ho-gyeong who is the oldest ancestor of Taejo of Goryeo. Gang Yun-Seong who failed in Imperial examination in the time of Chunghye of Goryeo is 6 generation descent of Gang Chiyon. Also, Gang Yun-Seong's daughter is Queen Sindeok who was the second wife of King Taejo of Joseon.

References

Sources

Date of birth unknown
Date of death unknown
13th-century Korean people
History of Korea
Wars involving Goryeo